Karoo is an impact crater on the asteroid 253 Mathilde, named for the Great Karoo Basin, a coal basin in South Africa.  It is 33.4 kilometers in diameter and was the most prominent crater seen during NEAR Shoemaker's flyby of the asteroid.

Mysteries on Karoo's formation
The critical crater diameter is the scale at which cratering “goes global” and results in a solitary distinct crater.  All smaller craters—however large Dcrit might be—are local events. Mathilde is thus a particularly interesting case, since it is the largest asteroid imaged at sufficient resolution to show that its topography is clearly exogenic, governed by impacts. Mathilde has several craters of a similar size to Karoo; according to gravity-regime scaling it suffered ∼5 impacts by objects, ranging from ∼0.8 to 1.2 km diameter, without being struck once by an object large enough to disrupt it. This seems odd, and Cheng and Barnouin-Jha (1999) find Mathilde's survival unlikely, and appeal to oblique impacts. But it may be an effect of preservation in the case where Dcrit is so large that even hemisphere-spanning craters are, by definition, “local.” If, for example, Mathilde's attenuation is somewhat higher than usual, say α = 1.4, then based on Fig. 2 none of its craters exceeds the critical crater diameter. This would explain the crowding of giant craters, since none of these would result in global degradation. Indeed, if Karoo, at 33 km diameter, represents Dcrit and resurfaced the asteroid, then the 5 or more other giant impacts must have happened subsequently, which is highly unusual given that they are in fact almost just as large. Thus α = 1.33 from Fig. 2a is likely a lower limit on Mathilde's attenuation.

References

253 Mathilde
Impact craters on asteroids